The Geographical Names Board of Canada (GNBC) is a national committee with a secretariat in Natural Resources Canada, part of the Government of Canada, which authorizes the names used and name changes on official federal government maps of Canada created since 1897. The board consists of 27 members, one from each of the provinces and territories, and others from departments of the Government of Canada. The board also is involved with names of areas in the Antarctic through the Antarctic Treaty.

Structure
The secretariat is provided by Natural Resources Canada. In addition to the provincial and territorial members are members from the following federal government departments: Aboriginal Affairs and Northern Development Canada, Canada Post Corporation, Fisheries and Oceans Canada, Elections Canada, Library and Archives Canada, Department of National Defence, Natural Resources Canada (including Geological Survey of Canada and Canada Centre for Mapping and Earth Observation), Parks Canada, Statistics Canada, and the Translation Bureau. The Chair of the Geographical Names Board of Canada is Connie Wyatt Anderson from The Pas, Manitoba.

Process
In a two year period of 2019-2020, 750 names were added to the database with roughly 100 changes to names of already existing places. Citizens and government officials have the ability to write in with a form that is able to be filled out.  The local naming authority then becomes involved on the place in question gathering suggestions from the local and indigenous communities. This can include the revival of indigenous names, notable examples include qathet, Haida Gwaii, and the Salish Sea. Provincial governments have also taken liberty to change names, including Nunavut, Ontario, British Columbia, and Quebec. Certain laws may apply such as for regional districts which typically have to include a distinguish geographic feature of the area in its name.

See also
Federal Information Processing Standard
GeoBase
Geographic Names Information System
GPS·C

External links
Canadian Geographical Names at Natural Resources Canada

References 

1897 establishments in Canada
Federal departments and agencies of Canada
Geocodes
Government agencies established in 1897
Names of places in Canada
Natural Resources Canada
Geographical naming agencies